The Hook Peninsula is a peninsula in County Wexford, Ireland. It has been a gateway to south-east Ireland for successive waves of newcomers, including the Vikings, Anglo-Normans and the English.

The coastline has a number of beaches. The peninsula's fishing villages, bird watching on the mudflats of Bannow Estuary, deep sea angling, snorkeling and swimming are part of the area's maritime life. The area's rivers, valleys, estuaries and hills have long provided south-west Wexford with rich grazing land.

See also
 Hook Head, headland on the peninsula 
 Hook Lighthouse, at the tip of the peninsula 
 Fethard-on-Sea, a village 
 Duncannon, a village 
 Loftus Hall, a country house
 Slade, a village overlooked by Slade Castle

Further reading

External links 
 Hook Peninsula website

Peninsulas of County Wexford